Decarboxylation is a chemical reaction that removes a carboxyl group and releases carbon dioxide (CO2). Usually, decarboxylation refers to a reaction of carboxylic acids, removing a carbon atom from a carbon chain. The reverse process, which is the first chemical step in photosynthesis, is called carboxylation, the addition of CO2 to a compound. Enzymes that catalyze decarboxylations are called decarboxylases or, the more formal term, carboxy-lyases (EC number 4.1.1).

In organic chemistry 
The term "decarboxylation" usually means replacement of a carboxyl group with a hydrogen atom:

RCO2H  ->  RH  +  CO2
Decarboxylation is one of the oldest known organic reactions. It is one of the processes assumed to accompany pyrolysis and destructive distillation. Metal salts, especially copper compounds, facilitate the reaction via the intermediacy of metal carboxylate complexes. Decarboxylation of aryl carboxylates can generate the equivalent of the corresponding aryl anion, which in turn can undergo cross coupling reactions.

Decarboxylation of alkanoic acids is often slow. Thus, typical fatty acids do not decarboxylate readily. Overall, the facility of decarboxylation depends upon stability of the carbanion intermediate .  Important exceptions are the decarboxylation of beta-keto acids, β,γ-unsaturated acids, and α-phenyl, α-nitro, and α-cyanoacids.  Such reactions are accelerated due to the formation of a zwitterionic tautomer in which the carbonyl is protonated and the carboxyl group is deprotonated.

Named decarboxylation reactions
Decarboxylations are the bases of many named reactions. These include Barton decarboxylation, Kolbe electrolysis, Kochi reaction,  and Hunsdiecker reaction. All are radical reactions. The Krapcho decarboxylation is a related decarboxylation of an ester. The Tsuji–Trost reaction involves the intermediacy of an allyl complex.

In ketonic decarboxylation a carboxylic acid is converted to a ketone.

Hydrodecarboxylation
Hydrodecarboxylations involve the conversion of a carboxylic acid to the corresponding hydrocarbon. This is conceptually the same as the more general term "decarboxylation" as defined above except that it specifically requires that the carboxyl group is, as expected, replaced by a hydrogen. The reaction is especially common in conjunction with the malonic ester synthesis and Knoevenagel condensations. The reaction involves the conjugate base of the carboxyl group, a carboxylate ion, and an unsaturated receptor of electron density, such as a protonated carbonyl group.  Where reactions entail heating the carboxylic acid with concentrated hydrochloric acid, such a direct route is impossible as it would produce protonated carbon dioxide. In these cases, the reaction is likely to occur by initial addition of water and a proton.

In biochemistry 
Decarboxylations are pervasive in biology.  They are often classified according to the cofactors that catalyze the transformations.  Biotin-coupled processes effect the decarboxylation of malonyl-CoA to acetyl-CoA. Thiamine (T:) is the active component for decarboxylation of alpha-ketoacids, including pyruvate:
T\! :  +\ RC(O)CO2H  ->  T=C(OH)R{} +  CO2
T=C(OH)R{} +  R'COOH -> T\! :  +\ RC(O)CH(OH)R'
Pyridoxal phosphate promotes decarboxylation of amino acids. Flavin-dependent decarboxylases are involved in transformations of cysteine.
Iron-based hydroxylases operate by reductive activation of  using the decarboxylation of alpha-ketoglutarate as an electron donor.  The decarboxylation can be depicted as such:
RC(O)CO2Fe^{II}{} +  O2 ->  RCO2Fe^{IV}\! =O  +  CO2
RCO2Fe^{IV}\! =O  +  R'-H  -> RCO2Fe^{II}{} +  R'OH

Decarboxylation of amino acids
Common biosynthetic oxidative decarboxylations of amino acids to amines are: 
 tryptophan to tryptamine
 phenylalanine to phenylethylamine
 tyrosine to tyramine
 histidine to histamine
 serine to ethanolamine
 glutamic acid to GABA
 lysine to cadaverine
 arginine to agmatine
 ornithine  to putrescine
 5-HTP to serotonin
 L-DOPA to dopamine

Other decarboxylation reactions from the citric acid cycle include: 
 pyruvate to acetyl-CoA (see pyruvate decarboxylation)
 oxalosuccinate to α-ketoglutarate
 α-ketoglutarate to succinyl-CoA.

Case studies

Upon heating, Δ9-tetrahydrocannabinolic acid decarboxylates to give the psychoactive compound Δ9-Tetrahydrocannabinol.  When cannabis is heated in vacuum, the decarboxylation of tetrahydrocannabinolic acid (THCA) appears to follow first order kinetics.  The log fraction of THCA present decreases steadily over time, and the rate of decrease varies according to temperature.  At 10-degree increments from 100 to 140 °C, half of the THCA is consumed in 30, 11, 6, 3, and 2 minutes; hence the rate constant follows Arrhenius' law, ranging between 10−8 and 10−5 in a linear log-log relationship with inverse temperature.  However, modelling of decarboxylation of salicylic acid with a water molecule had suggested an activation barrier of 150 kJ/mol for a single molecule in solvent, much too high for the observed rate.  Therefore, it was concluded that this reaction, conducted in the solid phase in plant material with a high fraction of carboxylic acids, follows a pseudo first order kinetics in which a nearby carboxylic acid precipitates without affecting the observed rate constant.  Two transition states corresponding to indirect and direct keto-enol routes are possible, with energies of 93 and 104 kJ/mol.  Both intermediates involve protonation of the alpha carbon, disrupting one of the double bonds of the aromatic ring and permitting the beta-keto group (which takes the form of an enol in THCA and THC) to participate in decarboxylation.

In beverages stored for long periods, very small amounts of benzene may form from benzoic acid by decarboxylation catalyzed by the presence of ascorbic acid.

The addition of catalytic amounts of cyclohexenone has been reported to catalyze the decarboxylation of amino acids. However, using such catalysts may also yield an amount of unwanted by-products.

References

Substitution reactions